Skin Alley were a British progressive rock band founded by Thomas Crimble and Alvin Pope in the autumn of 1968. The original lineup consisted of Crimble on bass guitar and vocals, Pope on drums, Max Taylor on guitar, and Jeremy Sagar on lead vocals. Taylor and Sagar left early in 1969, and were replaced by Krzysztof Henryk Juszkiewicz on Hammond organ and Bob James on saxophone, flute, guitar and vocals.

Career
The band, comprising Thomas Crimble, Alvin Pope, Krzysztof Henryk Juszkiewicz and Bob James, were signed to CBS Records for their eponymous 1970 debut, and its 1970 follow-up, To Pagham and Beyond. Crimble moved on that year to play bass with Hawkwind and organise the Glastonbury Festival, and was replaced by Nick Graham (formerly of Atomic Rooster, not to be confused with Nicky Graham from The End and Tucky Buzzard) before the album was completed, Graham singing on two of the tracks. Pope was later replaced by Tony Knight.

In May 1972, Skin Alley appeared at Lincoln Festival's NME-sponsored Giants of Tomorrow marquee. A switch to the Transatlantic Records label in 1972 heralded the release of the band's third LP, Two Quid Deal. By the time their fourth album, Skintight, was released in 1973, they were playing more commercial, mainstream rock with orchestration and brass arrangements. The band split shortly afterwards, with Graham having the most successful post-Skin career with his groups Alibi and the Humans in the early 1980s.

US-based Columbia Records had no interest in the band and declined to release either CBS album in the US. The third and fourth albums were issued in the US by Stax Records.  Although Stax was keen on expanding its repertoire into rock, the label was not successful in promoting its rock acts, and both Skin Alley albums were largely ignored in the US.

Band members
 Thomas Crimble - bass, vocals, keyboards, harmonica  
 Robert 'Bob' James - saxophone, flute, guitar, vocals
 Krzysztof Henryk Juszkiewicz - organ, piano, accordion, harpsichord, mellotron, vocals, trumpet
 Giles 'Alvin' Pope - drums, percussion
 Nick Graham - vocals, keyboards, bass, flute
 Tony Knight - drums, vocals

Albums
 Skin Alley (CBS 63847) March 1970
 To Pagham and Beyond (CBS 64140) December 1970
 Two Quid Deal? (Transatlantic Big T TRA 260) October 1972
 Skintight (Transatlantic Big T TRA 273) November 1973

Singles
 "Tell Me" / "Better Be Blind" (CBS 5045) 1970 
 "You Got Me Danglin'" / "Skin Valley Serenade" (Big T BIG 506) 1972 
 "In The Midnight Hour" / "Broken Eggs" (Big T BIG 511) 1972

References

Musical groups established in 1969
British progressive rock groups